Mantas Kalnietis (born 6 September 1986) is a Lithuanian former professional basketball player who last played for Žalgiris Kaunas of the Lithuanian Basketball League (LKL) and the EuroLeague. He was also a member of the Lithuanian national basketball team. He would preferably take the point guard position, but could play shooting guard as well.

Early years
Kalnietis spent two and a half seasons with the LKKA-Žalgiris. He averaged 17.7 points and 4.3 assists in his second season.

Professional career
Kalnietis made his pro debut in February 2006 with the Žalgiris Kaunas. He averaged 6.8 points on 65 percent shooting in the EuroLeague.

Kalnietis helped Žalgiris win a Baltic League title in 2008, two Lithuanian League titles in 2007 and 2008 and two Lithuanian Cups in 2007 and 2008. He also led the team to a 2007 ULEB Summer League title, where he was named MVP.

He competed at the Reebok Eurocamp in Treviso in 2006 and 2008.

Kalnietis had a breakout season in 2008–09, when he averaged 11.3 points in the Lithuanian League and 8.5 points and 3.0 assists in the EuroLeague. He scored a career-high 20 points in a loss against the Montepaschi Siena on 10 December 2008.

Kalnietis signed a three-year contract with the Benetton Treviso in June 2009. However, because he had another one-year contract with Žalgiris Kaunas, FIBA arbiter's decided that he belonged to Žalgiris. On 27 December 2010, he signed a three-year extension with his hometown club Žalgiris Kaunas. In October 2012, however, he announced that he's interested in playing abroad for the first time in Russia's Lokomotiv Kuban Krasnodar. On 5 October, he signed a three-year contract with the team. On 18 December 2013, Kalnietis was named Lithuania Basketball Player of the Year. On 27 April 2015, he parted ways with Lokomotiv.

In July 2015, he joined the Indiana Pacers for the 2015 NBA Summer League. On 17 July 2015, he returned to Žalgiris Kaunas, signing a one-year contract. On 23 January 2016, he left Žalgiris and signed a 1.5-year contract with Olimpia Milano.

On 24 July 2018, Kalnietis signed a one-year contract with ASVEL of the French LNB Pro A.

In 2019, Kalnietis returned to the PBC Lokomotiv Kuban. On 25 October 2020, Kalnietis scored 11 points, grabbed 4 rebounds, dished out 17 assists and broke the VTB United League's all-time record of assists in a single game.

On 21 June 2021, he has signed a two-year contract with Žalgiris Kaunas, where his career had started.

National team career
Kalnietis started at point guard for the Lithuanian national basketball team that finished seventh in the 2006 FIBA World Championship. He averaged 6.0 points and 2.8 assists. He also played at the 2010 FIBA World Championship, as a starter, and won a bronze medal. He played in seven games for Lithuania at the 2012 Summer Olympics, averaging 5.5 points. He led the Lithuanian national team during EuroBasket 2013 to silver medals, averaging 12.1 points and 5 assists per game (the tournament's assist leader). He missed the 2014 FIBA Basketball World Cup, due to a clavicular dislocation, but returned to the national team at EuroBasket 2015. During the same championship, on 7 September, versus the Belgian national team, he achieved the EuroBasket's all-time single-game record of 13 assists, only to be tied days later for the same record by Miloš Teodosić. The Lithuanian national team won their second straight silver medal in 2015, and Kalnietis was once again the tournament's assists leader, with an average of 7.8 assists per game. Furthermore, he dished out 70 assists in total, which is the all-time record of assists for a single EuroBasket. Kalnietis also remained assists leader in EuroBasket 2017, averaging 7.2 per game.

Career statistics

EuroLeague

|-
| style="text-align:left;"|2005–06
| style="text-align:left;" rowspan="7"|Žalgiris
| 4 || 1 || 16.4 || .600 || .333 || .333 || 2.0 || 2.0 || 1.3 || .5 || 6.8 || 8.5
|-
| style="text-align:left;"|2006–07
| 13 || 1 || 12.8 || .560 || .333 || .500 || 1.2 || 1.3 || .8 || .1 || 4.0 || 4.2
|-
| style="text-align:left;"|2007–08
| 16 || 0 || 7.3 || .357 || .167 || .444 || .7 || .8 || .1 || .0 || 1.6 || 1.1
|-
| style="text-align:left;"|2008–09
| 10 || 6 || 24.6 || .420 || .310 || .727 || 2.3 || 3.0 || 1.2 || .2 || 8.5 || 7.3
|-
| style="text-align:left;"|2009–10
| 16 || 16 || 30.1 || .483 || .275 || .800 || 2.8 || 3.6 || 1.0 || .2 || 9.0 || 10.2
|-
| style="text-align:left;"|2010–11
| 15 || 7 || 22.2 || .515 || .371 || .750 || 2.8 || 1.9 || .2 || .1 || 9.1 || 8.7
|-
| style="text-align:left;"|2011–12
| 16 || 12 || 22.2 || .408 || .222 || .636 || 2.5 || 3.7 || .6 || .1 || 7.6 || 7.6
|-
| style="text-align:left;"|2013–14
| style="text-align:left;"|Lokomotiv
| 24 || 19 || 28.1 || .457 || .250 || .658 || 3.0 || 4.8 || 1.0 || .1 || 9.4 || 11.8
|-
| style="text-align:left;"|2015–16
| style="text-align:left;"|Žalgiris
| 14 || 12 || 23.6 || .356 || .300 || .857 || 2.2 || 4.1 || .7 || .1 || 6.8 || 5.9
|-
| style="text-align:left;"|2016–17
| style="text-align:left;"  rowspan="2"|Milano
| 26 || 9 || 19.4 || .435 || .368 || .667 || 2.3 || 2.9 || .8 || .1 || 7.2 || 7.6
|-
| style="text-align:left;"|2017–18
| 20 || 3 || 16.3 || .367 || .382 || .905 || 1.8 || 2.1 || .5 || .1 || 4.5 || 4.9
|- class="sortbottom"
| style="text-align:center;" colspan="2"|Career
| 174 || 86 || 20.7 || .441 || .303 || .698 || 2.2 || 2.9 || .7 || .1 || 6.8 || 7.2

EuroCup

|-
| style="text-align:left;background:#AFE6BA;"|2012–13†
| style="text-align:left;" rowspan="2"|Lokomotiv
| 12 || 10 || 33.7 || .493 || .298 || .500 || 2.9 || 4.9 || .4 || .3 || 13.4 || 14.2
|-
| style="text-align:left;"|2014–15
| 5 || 1 || 12.8 || .412 || .286 || 1.000 || .8 || 1.6 || .2 || .2 || 3.4 || 2.0
|-
| style="text-align:left;"|2015–16
| style="text-align:left;"|Milano
| 6 || 2 || 22.1 || .524 || .389 || .875 || 1.3 || 2.3 || 1.2 || .2 || 9.7 || 9.7
|-
| style="text-align:left;"|2018–19
| style="text-align:left;"|ASVEL
| 18 || 15 || 25.0 || .424 || .360 || .829 || 2.9 || 5.7 || .9 || .1 || 10.2 || 13.6
|-
| style="text-align:left;"|2019–20
| style="text-align:left;" rowspan="2"|Lokomotiv
| 10 || 5 || 24.5 || .516 || .296 || .813 || 2.3 || 3.5 || .5 || .2 || 6.9 || 8.7
|-
| style="text-align:left;"|2020–21
| 18 || 17 || 28.0 || .581 || .379 || .760 || 2.8 || 7.1''' || .7 || .2 || 8.7 || 13.4
|- class="sortbottom"
| style="text-align:center;" colspan="2"|Career
| 41 || 28 || 25.6 || .462 || .340 || .714 || 2.4 || 4.5 || .7 || .2 || 10.2 || 11.8

References

External links

Euroleague.net profile
FIBA profile

1986 births
Living people
2006 FIBA World Championship players
2010 FIBA World Championship players
2019 FIBA Basketball World Cup players
ASVEL Basket players
Basketball players at the 2012 Summer Olympics
Basketball players at the 2016 Summer Olympics
Basketball players from Kaunas
BC Žalgiris players
BC Žalgiris-2 players
Lega Basket Serie A players
Lithuanian expatriate basketball people in France
Lithuanian expatriate basketball people in Italy
Lithuanian expatriate basketball people in Russia
Lithuanian men's basketball players
Olimpia Milano players
Olympic basketball players of Lithuania
Pallacanestro Treviso players
PBC Lokomotiv-Kuban players
Point guards